The 1998 Big South Conference men's basketball tournament took place February 25 to 28 in 1998 at the Vines Center in Lynchburg, Virginia, the home of the Liberty Flames. For the first time in their school history, the Radford Highlanders won the tournament, led by head coach Ron Bradley.

Format
All seven teams participated in the tournament, hosted at the Vines Center. Teams were seeded by conference winning percentage. This was the last season for UMBC as a member of the league.

Bracket

* Asterisk indicates overtime game
Source

All-Tournament Team
Kevin Robinson, Radford
Ryan Charles, Radford
Corey Reed, Radford
Kevin Martin, UNC Asheville
Josh Pittman, UNC Asheville

References

Tournament
Big South Conference men's basketball tournament
Big South Conference men's basketball tournament
Big South Conference men's basketball tournament